Horsham Friends Meeting is a Quaker meeting house located in Horsham, Pennsylvania, home to Horsham Monthly Meeting. It has been listed on the National Register of Historic Places since 1991-06-21. In addition to serving as a place of worship, the Quaker School at Horsham is located on the meeting's grounds. A carriage house is located next to the meeting and an attached graveyard is situated across Easton Road, the street that the Meeting sits on.

Made of squared and cut pink sandstone, the meeting house is an example of a style of meeting houses known as "double meeting houses", so named due to their separate entrances for men and women.  A central partition can be closed to divide the interior into men's and women's sections. An interior balcony encircles the entire meeting room.

The current meeting house, built in 1803, is the third on the site.  Horsham Friends Meeting was founded in 1716. Land in the area was originally deeded from William Penn to Samuel Carpenter. Hannah Carpenter deeded the surrounding fifty acres to the meeting in 1718.

Horsham Meeting is an active Quaker community, and is a member of Abington Quarterly Meeting, of Philadelphia Yearly Meeting

Gallery

References

External links
Living Places listing
Horsham Friends meeting
Abington Quarterly Meeting of Friends

Quaker meeting houses in Pennsylvania
Churches on the National Register of Historic Places in Pennsylvania
Churches in Montgomery County, Pennsylvania
National Register of Historic Places in Montgomery County, Pennsylvania